KDOG (96.7 FM, "Hot 96.7") is a radio station serving Mankato, Minnesota. The station airs a Top 40 (CHR) format. They are licensed to North Mankato, Minnesota and serves the Mankato area and the Minnesota River Valley. KDOG is owned by Linder Radio Group.

History
The station went on the air in 1984 with a Top 40 (CHR) format as "96.7 K-Dog", although some of the original staff recall the launch date as April 1st 1985.  Original staff was as follows: Rick Williams (Morning Drive), Brian Garvin (Midday Drive), John McCormick (Afternoon Drive), Dr. Bob (Evening Drive), Randy Paul (Overnights).  At the time, KDOG competed with KEEZ "Z99". Over the years, the station has tweaked its on-air presentation slightly, going so far as to rebrand itself as "96.7 The Spot" in May 1999, with a modern AC orientation and the syndicated Bob and Sheri morning show. The station dropped the "Spot" moniker and transitioned to a broader hot adult contemporary format in August 2002, and flipped to adult hits in 2006. From April 2006 to July 2008, KDOG simulcasted on sister station KNSG in Springfield, Minnesota, which serves Redwood Falls and Marshall. On September 4, 2009, KDOG returned to its CHR roots as "Hot 96.7". On November 1, 2018, KEEZ flipped to Adult Contemporary, leaving KDOG as the only CHR radio station in the Mankato area.

References

External links
Hot 96.7

Contemporary hit radio stations in the United States
Radio stations in Minnesota
Radio stations established in 1984